Paul Townend (born 15 September 1990) is an Irish jockey who competes in National Hunt racing. Townend comes from Midleton in County Cork and rides primarily for the stable of Irish trainer Willie Mullins. Townend has worked for Mullins since beginning his career as an apprentice flat racing jockey. He was Irish jump racing Champion Jockey for the 2010–11, 2018–19, 2019–20, 2020–21 and 2021–22 seasons. 

In 2019 he gave Willie Mullins his first Cheltenham Gold Cup winner with Al Boum Photo, he repeated this success in 2020. Following the retirement of Ruby Walsh, Townend became the number one jockey to the Mullins yard.

Cheltenham Festival winners (28) 
Cheltenham Gold Cup   -(3) Al Boum Photo (2019, 2020), Galopin Des Champs (2023)
 Queen Mother Champion Chase - (2) Energumene (2022, 2023)
Arkle Challenge Trophy     -(2) Duc des Genievres  (2019), El Fabiolo (2023)
Broadway Novices' Chase - (1) - Monkfish (2021)
Supreme Novices' Hurdle - (1) Appreciate It (2021)
 Ballymore Novices' Hurdle - (2) Sir Gerhard (2022), Impaire Et Passe  (2023)
Champion Bumper - (1) Ferny Hollow (2020)
David Nicholson Mares' Hurdle    -(1) Glens Melody  (2015)
Albert Bartlett Novices' Hurdle    -(2) Penhill (2017), Monkfish (2020)
Stayers' Hurdle   -(1) Penhill  (2018)
Triumph Hurdle  -(3) Burning Victory (2020), Vauban (2022), Lossiemouth (2023)
Centenary Novices' Handicap Chase - (1) Irish Cavalier (2015)
Fred Winter Juvenile Novices' Handicap Hurdle - (1) What A Charm (2011)
County Handicap Hurdle - (3) Wicklow Brave (2015), Arctic Fire (2017), State Man (2022)
 Liberthine Mares' Chase - (1) Colreevy (2021)
 Ryanair Chase - (2) Min (2020), Allaho (2022)
 Dawn Run Mares' Novices' Hurdle - (1) Laurina (2018)

Major wins
 Ireland
 Irish Gold Cup - (1) Galopin Des Champs (2023)
Arkle Novice Chase    - (4) Golden Silver (2009),  Footpad (2018), Energumene (2021), Blue Lord (2022)
 Alanna Homes Champion Novice Hurdle - (2) Gaillard Du Mesnil (2021), State Man (2022)
Dublin Chase -  (3) Chacun Pour Soi (2020,2021,2022)
Champion Stayers Hurdle    - (2) Quevega (2010), Klassical Dream (2022)
Chanelle Pharma Novice Hurdle    - (3) Champagne Fever (2013), Appreciate It (2021), Sir Gerhard (2022)
Christmas Hurdle    - (2) Mourad (2010), Klassical Dream (2021)
 Punchestown Gold Cup - (1) Allaho (2022)
Dr P. J. Moriarty Novice Chase    - (5) Citizen Vic (2010), Boston Bob (2013), Faugheen (2020), Monkfish (2021), Galopin Des Champs (2022)
Future Champions Novice Hurdle    - (4) Hurricane Fly (2008), Saturnas (2016), Appreciate It (2020), Facile Vega (2022)
Golden Cygnet Novice Hurdle    - (2) Outlander (2015), Gaillard Du Mesnil (2021)
Greenmount Park Novice Chase    - (1) Bellshill (2016)
Hatton's Grace Hurdle    - (1) Hurricane Fly (2010)
Fort Leney Novice Chase - (2) Monkfish (2020), Gaillard Du Mesnil (2022)
 Champion Four Year Old Hurdle - (1) Vauban (2022)
John Durkan Memorial Punchestown Chase    - (2) Min (2019), Galopin Des Champs (2022)
Herald Champion Novice Hurdle    - (1) Blackstairmountain (2010)
Irish Champion Hurdle    - (2) Hurricane Fly (2011), State Man (2023)
Irish Daily Mirror Novice Hurdle    - (5) Marasonnien (2012), Killultagh Vic (2015), Next Destination (2018), Galopin Des Champs (2021), The Nice Guy (2022)
Mares Champion Hurdle    -(5) Tarla (2010), Glens Melody (2013), Whiteout (2016), Benie Des Dieux (2018,2019)
Mares Novice Hurdle Championship Final    - (3) Adriana Des Mottes  (2014), Laurina (2018), Brandy Love (2022)
Morgiana Hurdle    -(3) Faugheen (2017), Sharjah (2018), State Man (2022)
Paddy Power Dial-A-Bet Chase    - (3) Golden Silver (2009), Twinlight  (2014), Chacun Pour Soi (2020)
Punchestown Champion Chase -(4) Golden Silver (2010), Un de Sceaux (2019), Chacun Pour Soi (2021), Energumene (2022)
Punchestown Champion Hurdle    -(1) Hurricane Fly (2010)
Racing Post Novice Chase    - (3) Blackstairmountain (2011), Arvika Ligeonniere  (2012), Ferny Hollow (2021)
Royal Bond Novice Hurdle    -(3)  Hurricane Fly (2008), Zaidpour (2010), Nichols Canyon (2014)
December Festival Hurdle     - (3) Hurricane Fly (2010), Unaccompanied (2011), State Man (2022)
 Ryanair Novice Chase - (2) Energumene (2021), Blue Lord (2022)
Slaney Novice Hurdle    - (2) Mckinley (2015), Next Destination (2018)
Spring Juvenile Hurdle    - (3) Unaccompanied (2011),  Mr Adjudicator (2018), Vauban (2022)
 Boylesports Gold Cup - (1) Galopin Des Champs (2022)

 Great Britain
Clarence House Chase    -(1) Un de Sceaux (2018)
Maghull Novices' Chase    -(1) Douvan (2016)
Melling Chase    -(1) Boston Bob (2014)
Mersey Novices' Hurdle    -(1) Yorkhill (2016)

 France
 Grande Course de Haies d'Auteuil -(1) Benie des Dieux (2019)

References 

1990 births
Irish jockeys
Living people
Sportspeople from County Cork